Geopotential is the potential of the Earth's gravity field. For convenience it is often defined as the negative of the potential energy per unit mass, so that the gravity vector is obtained as the gradient of the geopotential, without the negation. In addition to the actual potential (the geopotential), a hypothetical normal potential and their difference, the disturbing potential, can also be defined.

Concept
For geophysical applications, gravity is distinguished from gravitation. Gravity is defined as the resultant force of gravitation and the centrifugal force caused by the Earth's rotation. Likewise, the respective scalar potentials can be added to form an effective potential called the geopotential, . 
The surfaces of constant geopotential or isosurfaces of the geopotential are called equigeopotential surfaces, also known as geopotential surfaces, equipotential surfaces, or simply level surfaces. 
Global mean sea surface is close to one equigeopotential called the geoid. How the gravitational force and the centrifugal force add up to a force orthogonal to the geoid is illustrated in the figure (not to scale). At latitude 50 deg the off-set between the gravitational force (red line in the figure) and the local vertical (green line in the figure) is in fact 0.098 deg. For a mass point (atmosphere) in motion the centrifugal force no more matches the gravitational and the vector sum is not exactly orthogonal to the Earth surface. This is the cause of the coriolis effect for atmospheric motion.  

The geoid is a gently undulating surface due to the irregular mass distribution inside the Earth; it may be approximated however by an ellipsoid of revolution called the reference ellipsoid. The currently most widely used reference ellipsoid, that of the Geodetic Reference System 1980 (GRS80), approximates the geoid to within a little over ±100 m. One can construct a simple model geopotential  that has as one of its equipotential surfaces this reference ellipsoid, with the same model potential  as the true potential  of the geoid; this model is called a normal potential. The difference  is called the disturbing potential. Many observable quantities of the gravity field, such as gravity anomalies and deflections of the plumbline, can be expressed in this disturbing potential.

Formulation

The Earth's gravity field can be derived from a gravity potential (geopotential) field as follows:

The vector triad  is the orthonormal set of base vectors in space, pointing along the  coordinate axes.

Note that both gravity and its potential contain a contribution from the centrifugal pseudo-force due to the Earth's rotation. We can write

where  is the potential of the gravitational field,  that of the gravity field, and  that of the centrifugal force field.

The centrifugal force—per unit of mass, i.e., acceleration—is given by

where

is the vector pointing to the point considered straight from the Earth's rotational axis. 
It can be shown that this pseudo-force field, in a reference frame co-rotating with the Earth, has a potential associated with it that looks like this:

This can be verified by taking the gradient operator of this expression.

Normal potential 
To a rough approximation, the Earth is a sphere, or to a much better approximation, an ellipsoid. We can similarly approximate the gravity field of the Earth by a spherically symmetric field:

of which the equipotential surfaces—the surfaces of constant potential value—are concentric spheres.

It is more accurate to approximate the geopotential by a field that has the Earth reference ellipsoid as one of its equipotential surfaces, however. The most recent Earth reference ellipsoid is GRS80, or Geodetic Reference System 1980, which the Global Positioning system uses as its reference. Its geometric parameters are: semi-major axis a = 6378137.0 m, and flattening f = 1/298.257222101.

A geopotential field  is constructed, being the sum of a gravitational potential  and the known centrifugal potential , that has the GRS80 reference ellipsoid as one of its equipotential surfaces. If we also require that the enclosed mass is equal to the known mass of the Earth (including atmosphere) GM = 3986005 × 108 m3·s−2, we obtain for the potential at the reference ellipsoid:

Obviously, this value depends on the assumption that the potential goes asymptotically to zero at infinity, as is common in physics. For practical purposes it makes more sense to choose the zero point of normal gravity to be that of the reference ellipsoid, and refer the potentials of other points to this.

Disturbing potential 

Once a clean, smooth geopotential field  has been constructed matching the known GRS80 reference ellipsoid with an equipotential surface (we call such a field a normal potential) we can subtract it from the true (measured) potential  of the real Earth. The result is defined as T, the disturbing potential:

The disturbing potential T is numerically a great deal smaller than U or W, and captures the detailed, complex variations of the true gravity field of the actually existing Earth from point-to-point, as distinguished from the overall global trend captured by the smooth mathematical ellipsoid of the normal potential.

Geopotential number  

In practical terrestrial work, e.g., levelling, an alternative version of the geopotential is used called geopotential number , which are reckoned from the geoid upward:

where  is the geopotential of the geoid.

Simple case: sphere

For the purpose of satellite orbital mechanics, the geopotential is typically described by a series expansion into spherical harmonics (spectral representation). In this context the geopotential is taken as the potential of the gravitational field of the Earth, that is, leaving out the centrifugal potential.

Solving for geopotential in the simple case of a sphere:

Integrate to get

where:
 is the gravitational constant,
 is the mass of the earth,
 is the average radius of the earth,
 is the geometric height in meters
 is the geopotential at height , which is in units of [m2/s2] or [J/kg].

See also
 Geoid
 Geopotential height
 Geopotential model
 Normal gravity
 Physical geodesy

References

Gravimetry